Bianco is a town and comune in the Province of Reggio Calabria, in southern Italy. It is a seaside town and a popular tourist resort. The main attractions are the remainings of an old abbey and the ruins of a Roman house.

See also
Calabrian wine

References

Cities and towns in Calabria